Battle of Arcadiopolis may refer to:

 Battle of Arcadiopolis (970), between the Byzantines and a Rus'-Bulgarian army
 Battle of Arcadiopolis (1194), between the Byzantines and the Bulgarians